Hickok is an unincorporated community in Grant County, Kansas, United States.  It lies in eastern Lincoln Township along U.S. Route 160, 7 miles (11 km) east of the county seat of Ulysses.

References

Further reading

External links
 Grant County maps: Current, Historic, KDOT

Unincorporated communities in Grant County, Kansas
Unincorporated communities in Kansas